Dimitris 'Koliopoulos' Plapoutas (1786 – 1865) was a Greek general who fought during the Greek War of Independence against the rule of the Ottoman Empire.

Biography 
Plapoutas was born on in Paloumba in the Arcadia region of the Peloponnese, Ottoman Empire, the son of Kollias Plapoutas, who came from a strong line of Arvanite Greek Orthodox population from Epirus at the time, in northwestern Greece. This is of course the reason why Theodoros Kolokotronis referred to him simply as "Koliopoulos".

In 1811, he left Paloumba for the Ionian Islands where he became an officer in the 1st Regiment Greek Light Infantry. In 1818, he joined the Filiki Eteria, which was planning to liberate Greece from Ottoman control.

During the revolution, Dimitris Plapoutas took part in the Siege of Tripolitsa, the capture of the Acrocorinth, the Battle of Valtetsi, the Battle of Maniaki and other battles.

After independence, along with General Theodoros Kolokotronis and General Kitsos Tzavelas, Plapoutas supported Prince Otto of Bavaria as the King of Greece. However, later he opposed the Bavarian-dominated regency during his rule. He was charged with high treason and on 7 June 1834 he was imprisoned at the Palamidi along with Kolokotronis and both sentenced to death and both later pardoned in 1835. Plapoutas then became involved in Greek politics and served in Parliament (1844–1847) and in the Senate (1847–1862). He was made an honorary bodyguard of King Otto and was entrusted with escorting him to his new kingdom.

Plapoutas also had a brother, Georgios, who fought alongside him in many battles and died in the Battle of Lalas.

When he was around seventy years old, Plapoutas married a woman in her thirties and had one child, a girl named Athanasia. Plapoutas died shortly afterwards.

His house still stands (albeit heavily damaged from an earthquake during the 1960s) in his home town of Paloumpa, Arcadia.

Gallery

References 

1786 births
1864 deaths
19th-century heads of state of Greece
19th-century prime ministers of Greece
Greek military leaders of the Greek War of Independence
Greek generals
Members of the Greek Senate
Greek revolutionaries
Arvanites
People convicted of treason against Greece
Prisoners sentenced to death by Greece
Recipients of Greek royal pardons
1st Regiment Greek Light Infantry officers
People from Iraia
Members of the Royal Phalanx